The 1973 British Motor Cars of Los Angeles was a women's tennis tournament played on indoor carpet courts at The Forum in Los Angeles, California in the United States that was part of the 1973 Virginia Slims World Championship Series. The event had previously been held in Long Beach. It was the third edition of the tournament and was held from January 23 through January 27, 1973. The final was watched by 2,693 spectators who saw first-seeded Margaret Court win the singles title and earn $6,000 first-prize money.

Finals

Singles
 Margaret Court defeated  Nancy Gunter 7–5, 6–7(1–5), 7–5

Doubles
 Rosemary Casals /  Julie Heldman defeated  Margaret Court /  Lesley Hunt walkover

Prize money

References

British Motor Cars of Los Angeles 
LA Women's Tennis Championships
British Motor Cars of Los Angeles 
British Motor Cars of Los Angeles 
British Motor Cars of Los Angeles